Newcomb High School is a public high school in Newcomb, New Mexico (USA).  Newcomb High is a part of the Central Consolidated School District along with Kirtland Central High School and Shiprock High School.  The school colors are Kelly Green and Gold and the mascot is the Skyhawk.

Athletics and activities
Newcomb High School participates in NMAA's District 1-2A.

In 2019, the Newcomb boys basketball made history by appearing in their first state championship game. They would eventually take state runner-up and finished their season with an impressive record at 29–3.

State Championships

References

Public high schools in New Mexico
Schools in San Juan County, New Mexico
Education on the Navajo Nation